The Pao Huei Solitaire is a residential skyscraper located in Xitun District, Taichung, Taiwan. As of December 2020, it is the 10th tallest building in Taichung and 30th tallest in Taiwan.

See also 
 List of tallest buildings in Taiwan
 List of tallest buildings in Taichung
 Taichung's 7th Redevelopment Zone

References

2016 establishments in Taiwan
Residential skyscrapers in Taiwan
Skyscrapers in Taichung
Taichung's 7th Redevelopment Zone
Apartment buildings in Taiwan
Residential buildings completed in 2016